Darkness Prevails is the debut EP from Devil Sold His Soul, released in 2005. It was produced and recorded by Mark Williams at Criterion/Battery Studios, London. It was re-released in 2008 after their debut album A Fragile Hope was released and included bonus tracks and a DVD containing music videos and live footage.

Track listing

Re-release bonus tracks
"Clouds (Remix)"
"Darkness Prevails (Final Demo)"
"Some Friend (Original Demo)"
"Clouds (Final Demo)"
"Like It's Your Last (Original Demo)"

Bonus DVD
"Darkness Prevails" (music video)
"Clouds" (music video)
"Like It's Your Last" (music video)
"Recording" (studio video)
"Darkness Prevails" (live video)
"Like It's Your Last" (live video)
"The Starting" (live video)

References

2005 debut EPs
Devil Sold His Soul albums
Visible Noise EPs